Brenandendron frondosum is a plant in the family Asteraceae, native to tropical Africa.

Description
Inflorescences feature purple flowers.

Distribution and habitat
Brenandendron frondosum is native to Ivory Coast, Nigeria and Cameroon. Its habitat is in forest clearings.

References

Vernonieae
Flora of Ivory Coast
Flora of Nigeria
Flora of Cameroon
Plants described in 1877